The Olympus OM-D E-M5, announced in February 2012, is a Micro Four Thirds compact mirrorless interchangeable lens camera. In style and name it references the Olympus OM series of film SLR cameras, but it is not an SLR camera (there is no optical path from lens to viewfinder: a high quality electronic viewfinder is used). The successor is the Olympus OM-D E-M5 Mark II.

Awards
In April 2012, the enthusiast photography web site  Digital Photography Review (DP Review) awarded the OM-D EM-5 a Gold Award. On the same website it was subsequently voted Best Camera of 2012 in a photographers' poll.

Other photography news and reviews websites that awarded the OM-D EM-5 "Camera of the Year" for 2012 were photographyblog.com  and wirefresh. The camera also won a 2012 Pop Photo award from the magazine Popular Photography.

Features
 Magnesium alloy body with extensive weather sealing
 Up to ISO 25,600
 16 MP Four Thirds sensor, with substantially lower noise than the earlier 12 MP sensor
 HD video capture, including 1080i at 30 fps and 720p at 60 fps
 No built-in flash (a small shoe mounted flash is included, which can act as a wireless commander for E-system flashes which support wireless mode)
 TruePic VI processor
 5-axis in-body image stabilisation
 Up to nine frames per second continuous shooting
 Very fast contrast detect auto focus
 "Live Bulb" (without toggle) and "Live Time" (with toggle) bulb mode settings, where the viewfinder and display get updated 'during' the exposure in order to allow the photographer to inspect the exposure while it "develops". The display refresh rate for this mode can be configured between 0.5 s and 60 s.
 Tilting 800 x 600 LCD OLED touchscreen, allowing shooting from awkward angles and with the ability to select the focus point and release the shutter with a touch

References

External links

Official website
Olympus instruction manual (PDF)
User Guide: Getting the most out of the Olympus E-M5 at DPReview

OM-D E-M5
Cameras introduced in 2012